Risen may refer to:

Art and entertainment 
 Risen (series), a video game series
 Risen (video game), a 2009 game
 Risen (2016 film), a 2016 American biblical drama film
 Risen (2010 film), a 2010 Welsh film
 Risen (The Awakening album), a 1997 gothic rock album
 Risen (O.A.R. album), a 2001 rock album
 "Risen" (song), a 2019 rock song
 The Risen, a tabletop role-playing game book

Other uses 
 Risen Peak, a mountain in Antarctica
 Swiss Excellence Risen, a Swiss ultralight aircraft design
 Arnie Risen (1924–2012), American basketball player
 James Risen (born 1955), American journalist

See also
 
 
 Rise (disambiguation)
 RISN
 Rizen (disambiguation)